Lupinus cervinus is a species of lupine known by the common name Santa Lucia lupine. It is endemic to the Santa Lucia Mountains in the Central Coast Ranges in California, where it is an uncommon member of the flora in the mountain forests. The erect stem is surrounded by clusters of spreading leaves. The flower is often bright pink, but may be shades of blue to nearly white. There is often a yellow patch on the banner.

References

External links
Jepson Manual Treatment
Ventana Wilderness Alliance. Unique & Noteworthy Plants of the Santa Lucia Mountains, Part 2: Lupines (Lupinus) Summer 1999.
Photo gallery

cervinus
Endemic flora of California
Flora without expected TNC conservation status